Nahr-e Anbar Rural District is a rural district (dehestan) in Musian District, Dehloran County, Ilam Province, Iran. At the 2006 census, its population was 4,037, in 662 families.  The rural district has 13 villages.

References 

Rural Districts of Ilam Province
Dehloran County